Excoecaria glaucescens is a species of flowering plant in the family Euphorbiaceae. It was described in 1891. It is native to Madagascar.

References

glaucescens
Plants described in 1891
Endemic flora of Madagascar